5F-AB-FUPPYCA (also known as AZ-037) is a pyrazole-based synthetic cannabinoid that is presumed to be an agonist of the CB1 receptor and has been sold online as a designer drug. It was first detected by the EMCDDA as part of a seizure of 540 g white powder in France in February 2015.

The name AZ-037 is also used as a synonym for its structural isomer 5-fluoro-3,5-AB-PFUPPYCA. Thus AZ-037 is being used as a synonym for two different compounds.

5-fluoro-3,5-AB-PFUPPYCA has been detected in synthetic cannabinoid smoke blends in the USA as early as December 30, 2021, along with ADB-BUTINACA, MDA-19 (BZO-HEXOXIZID) and MDMB-4en-PINACA.

5-fluoro-AB-PFUPPYCA contains some similar structural elements to other synthetic cannabinoids such as AB-CHFUPYCA, JWH-307, JWH-030, JWH-147, AB-PINACA. It may be considered an analog of the traditional pyrazole cannabinoid receptor 1 antagonist rimonabant. The pharmacological properties of 5F-AB-FUPPYCA have not been studied.

See also 

 AB-CHFUPYCA
 AM-6545
 TM-38837
 Rimonabant
 JWH-307
 JWH-147
 JWH-030
 AB-FUBINACA
 ADB-FUBINACA
 AMB-FUBINACA
 APP-FUBINACA
 MDA-19
 FUB-144
 FUB-APINACA
 FUB-JWH-018
 FDU-PB-22
 FUB-PB-22
 MDMB-FUBICA
 MDMB-FUBINACA

References 

Cannabinoids
Designer drugs
Fluoroarenes
Pyrazoles
Pyrazolecarboxamides
Organofluorides